The Red Apple is a 40-storey,  residential skyscraper on Wijnhaven Island in Rotterdam, Netherlands, designed by KCAP Architects & Planners and Jan des Bouvrie. The building was topped out in 2008, completed in 2009, and features 121 units, and a 338-space multi-storey car park. It is the eighth-tallest building in Rotterdam. The Kopblok is a  building that has an additional 79 apartment units and offices. The ground floor is designed for shops and restaurants. The entire complex has an open fiber network.

Gallery

See also
List of tallest buildings in Rotterdam
List of tallest buildings in the Netherlands
List of tallest structures in the Netherlands

References

External links

 The Red Apple official website
 KCAP Architects & Planners

Residential buildings completed in 2009
Skyscrapers in Rotterdam
Skyscraper office buildings in the Netherlands
Residential skyscrapers in the Netherlands